Raymond Jean Bourque (born December 28, 1960) is a Canadian former professional ice hockey player. He holds records for most career goals, assists, and points by a defenceman in the National Hockey League (NHL). He won the James Norris Memorial Trophy as the NHL's best defenceman five times, while finishing second for that trophy a further six times. He also twice finished second in the voting for the Hart Memorial Trophy, a rarity for a defenceman. He was named to the end-of-season All-Star teams 19 times, 13 on the first-team and six on the second-team.

Bourque was also an Olympian with Canada and became nearly synonymous with the Boston Bruins franchise, for which he played 21 seasons and became Boston's longest-serving captain. Bourque finished his career with the Colorado Avalanche, with whom he won his only Stanley Cup in his final NHL game. In 2017, he was named one of the 100 Greatest NHL Players.

Early life
Bourque was born in Saint-Laurent, Quebec, the son of Raymond Bourque Sr. and Anita Allain. Both of his parents were originally from New Brunswick, and moved to Montreal in the 1950s. His mother died from cancer when he was 12 years old, while his father died in 2009. Bourque was raised bilingual, speaking both English and French at home, though he went to a French school.

Playing career

Early career
Bourque was the third-round pick of the Trois-Rivières Draveurs of the Quebec Major Junior Hockey League (QMJHL). Halfway through his rookie season, head coach and general manager (GM) Michel Bergeron traded Bourque to Sorel for high-scoring Benoît Gosselin. After a stellar junior career with Sorel and Verdun of the QMJHL, in which he was named the league's best defenceman in 1978 and 1979, Bourque was drafted eighth overall by the Bruins in the 1979 NHL Entry Draft, with a first-round draft choice obtained from the Los Angeles Kings in a 1977 trade for goaltender Ron Grahame (whose son John would be a future teammate of Bourque's). Boston GM Harry Sinden intended to select defenceman Keith Brown, but Brown was selected by the Chicago Blackhawks immediately prior to Boston's selection. Panicking, the Bruins settled on Bourque, allegedly against their better judgment.

Boston Bruins
Bourque would make an immediate impact in Boston during his rookie season of 1979–80, scoring a goal in his first game while facing the Winnipeg Jets. Bourque asserted himself from the start as one of the best defensemen in the league, winning both the Calder Memorial Trophy as Rookie of the Year and a First Team All-Star selection, the first time in NHL history a non-goaltender had ever achieved the distinction. His 65 points that season was a record at the time for a rookie defenseman.

In 1985, upon the retirement of Bruins' captain Terry O'Reilly to coach the club, Bourque and veteran Rick Middleton were named co-captains of the team, Middleton to wear the "C" during home games and Bourque for road games. Upon Middleton's retirement in 1988, Bourque became the team's sole captain, and retained the position for the remainder of his Bruins' tenure. In so doing, he passed Dit Clapper as the longest-tenured Bruins' captain in history, as well as passing Alex Delvecchio of the Detroit Red Wings as the longest-serving team captain in NHL history, a mark since surpassed by Steve Yzerman of the Red Wings.

Bourque proved a solid force for Boston for 21 seasons (1979–2000), famous for combining offensive prowess at a level that few defencemen in league history had ever achieved—he was a perennial shot accuracy champion at All-Star Games—and near-unparalleled defensive excellence. Bourque won five Norris Trophies as the league's top defenceman and finished second to Mark Messier in 1990 in the closest race ever for the Hart Memorial Trophy, the league's Most Valuable Player award. The Bruins' reliance on Bourque's on-ice mastery was so total that—while Bourque was very durable throughout much of his career—the team was seen by many to flounder whenever he was out of the lineup.

During Bourque's tenure with the Bruins, the team continued what would be a North American professional record twenty-nine consecutive seasons in the playoffs, a streak that would persist through the 1996 season. In the playoffs, Bourque led the team to the Stanley Cup Final against the Edmonton Oilers in both 1988 and 1990, where the Bruins lost in both series. In the 1996–97 season, Bourque missed the playoffs for the only time in his career, when the Bruins finished with the NHL's worst record that season.

Bourque was also popular among Bruins fans because of his willingness to re-sign with Boston without any acrimonious or lengthy negotiations. He passed over several opportunities to set the benchmark salary for defenceman; instead, he usually quietly and quickly agreed to terms with the Bruins, and this stance irritated the National Hockey League Players' Association (NHLPA), which had been pushing to drive up players' wages.

Colorado Avalanche
The Bruins' record for most consecutive seasons in the playoffs by any team in North American professional sports was ended at 29 seasons in the 1996–97 season. The next two seasons, the Bruins returned to the playoffs and in 1999, they won a playoff series for the first time since 1994.

Despite a nucleus of young talent and high expectations for 1999–2000, injuries caused the Bruins to plummet to the bottom of their division, and they went on track to miss the playoffs. This was further exacerbated by negative attention over teammate Marty McSorley's hit on Donald Brashear. With his career nearing an end and the team going in the wrong direction, Bourque requested a trade from the fading Bruins so he would have a chance to win the Stanley Cup. Bourque and fellow veteran Dave Andreychuk were sent to Colorado in exchange for Brian Rolston, Martin Grenier, Samuel Påhlsson and a first-round draft pick (2000 draft, 27th overall, Martin Samuelsson).

Although Bourque played just one-and-a-half seasons with the Avalanche, he proved to be a force both on the ice and in the locker room. In 2000, he helped the struggling Avalanche improve their form and capture their division. During the playoffs, they advanced to the conference finals, where they lost to the Dallas Stars in a hard-fought series, with Bourque hitting the post in the last minutes of Game 7, which would have tied the game after his team rallied from a 3–0 deficit in the third period to 3–2.

Bourque returned to the Avs for the 2000–01 season and was named as an alternate captain. He led all Colorado defencemen in scoring and formed a solid defensive pairing with Adam Foote and Rob Blake, the latter of whom the Avs received from the Los Angeles Kings in a trade. Bourque was named to the post-season First All-Star team, finishing as runner-up to the Detroit Red Wings' Nicklas Lidström for the Norris Trophy.

The Avalanche advanced all the way to the Stanley Cup Finals, where Bourque scored the game-winning goal in Game 3 against the New Jersey Devils. Colorado took the series in seven games to win their second Stanley Cup. During the post-game presentation that followed the Avalanche's victory in the decisive seventh game, team captain Joe Sakic broke with tradition and gave the Cup to Bourque so he could skate with it first. Colorado goaltender Patrick Roy, whose fourth championship had come the same day as Bourque's first, said of the Stanley Cup and his teammate, "A name was missing from that [Cup], and today it is back to normal." Bourque had waited longer to win his first Cup than any other Cup-winning player had in the 108-year history of the Stanley Cup, having played 1,612 regular season and 214 playoff games before winning the ultimate prize.

On June 12, 2001, three days after the Cup victory, Bourque brought the Cup back to Boston for an emotional rally attended by some 20,000 fans at Boston's City Hall Plaza. Bourque retired shortly thereafter, having set defensive regular-season records in goals (410) and assists (1169) for 1579 points. During the 2000–01 season, which would be the last for both players, Bourque surpassed Paul Coffey (intended to be Bourque's replacement on his former team, the Bruins) to become the all-time leader in goals, assists and points for a defenceman at any senior professional level.

International play
Bourque played for Team Canada in the Canada Cup in 1981, 1984 and 1987. However, he did not play in the 1991 edition, despite attempts by Wayne Gretzky and Mark Messier to persuade him to take part. Bourque also played for the NHL All-Stars in Rendez-vous '87 against the Soviet Union, and played for the Canadian team in the 1998 Winter Olympics, leading all defencemen in scoring with one goal and two assists in six games.

Jersey number

For a majority of his NHL career, Bourque wore jersey number 77. After he retired following the 2000-2001 season, both the Bruins and the Avalanche honored him by retiring number 77.

When he was initially called up to the Bruins, Bourque was assigned the number 7, which had been worn by former Bruins star forward Phil Esposito from the time he was acquired by the team in 1967 until he departed in 1976 via trade. Bourque was the third player to be issued the number following Esposito's departure, following Sean Shanahan and Bill Bennett.

In 1987, six years after Esposito's retirement, and three years after he was elected to the Hockey Hall of Fame, the Bruins decided to retire number 7 in his honor. Bourque, thus, would be the last Bruin to wear #7 and was permitted to do so as long as he desired to even after Esposito's retirement ceremony, which was scheduled for December 3 of that year. Bourque, however, came up with his own way to honor the veteran Bruin and did so at the ceremony. 

As the Bruins were dressing for that night's game, Bourque put on two jerseys with his normal #7 as the top layer. When the team came out for the retirement ceremony, Bourque skated over to Esposito just before he was about to speak to the Boston crowd. He removed his #7 jersey and handed it to Esposito, a move that was seen as "surrendering" the number to him. In doing this, Bourque also revealed his new number to the crowd, as the jersey he had been wearing underneath his #7 bore the number 77 he would wear for the remainder of his career.

Retirement

Bourque was inducted into the Hockey Hall of Fame in 2004, his first season of eligibility. His uniform number 77 has been retired by both the Bruins and the Avalanche; he is one of only nine players whose jersey has been retired by more than one club. His birthplace of Saint-Laurent named the "Aréna Raymond-Bourque" in his honour.

Bourque and his wife Christiane still live in Massachusetts, where they are active in several local charities. Bourque was named a Bruins team consultant on November 3, 2005. He is also the co-owner of an Italian restaurant called Tresca in Boston's North End. Bourque founded the Bourque Family Foundation in the summer of 2017.

Bourque's younger brother Richard was also a hockey player and was drafted by the Bruins in the 1981 NHL Entry Draft in the tenth round, but never played professional hockey. Bourque's eldest son, Christopher, was drafted by the Washington Capitals in 2004. Christopher played for the Hershey Bears of the American Hockey League (AHL) in the 2007 season and made his NHL debut for the Capitals in 2007. Chris then joined the Boston Bruins on May 26, 2012. His younger son, Ryan, was a third-round draft choice of the New York Rangers in 2009, and was a member of the USA's 2010 gold-medal World Junior Championship team, earning three assists during the tournament. Ryan plays for the Hershey Bears in the AHL alongside his brother Chris and was an alternate captain for the USA's 2011 World Junior Championship team, in which he again earned three assists as the team won the bronze medal.

Awards and achievements
Bourque's exceptional talent as a player has led him to become one of the most honored players in hockey history. During his career, he was selected to thirteen NHL First Team (the most in history) and six Second Team All-Star squads, second in total in league history only to Gordie Howe and most amongst defencemen. He won the Norris Trophy as the top defenceman in the league five times, fourth all-time after Bobby Orr, Doug Harvey and Nicklas Lidström.

Among his numerous other records and honors are the following:

 11th all-time (4th among defencemen) in career games played with 1,612.
 4th all-time in career assists with 1,169; a record for defencemen.
 11th all-time in career points scored (1,579).
 1st in career points scored by a defenceman (1,579).
 1st in career goals scored by a defenceman (410).
 Career leader in shots on goal by a defenceman(6,206).
 Led the NHL in shots in 1984, 1987, and 1995.
 Holds the NHL record for most shots on goal in one game with 19 (Mar. 21, 1991)
 Is third in career  plus-minus with 528, behind Larry Robinson and Orr.
 Won the Calder Memorial Trophy in 1980
 Won the Norris Trophy in 1987, 1988, 1990, 1991, and 1994.
 Won the King Clancy Memorial Trophy in 1992.
 Received the Lester Patrick Trophy in 2003.
 NHL First Team All-Star in 1980, 1982, 1984, 1985, 1987, 1988, 1990, 1991, 1992, 1993, 1994, 1996, and 2001.
 Second Team All-Star in 1981, 1983, 1986, 1989, 1995 and 1999.
 Bruins' all-time career leader in games played (1,518), assists (1,111) and points (1,506), also ranking fourth in goals and first in assists with a single team (any position).
 Named to play in the All-Star Game for the 19th consecutive season, 2001; Bourque also appeared in the All-Star Game in every season that it was held during his career (there was no game in 1987 or 1995).
 Most Valuable Player of the All-Star Game in 1996.
 3rd all-time in playoff assists and 10th all-time in playoff points.
 Won the NHL All-star Game Shooting Accuracy Competition in 1990, 1992, 1993, 1997, 1998, 1999, 2000, and 2001.
 In 1998, three years before the end of his career, he was ranked number 14 on The Hockey News' list of the one hundred greatest hockey players of all time. He was the highest-ranking player who had not yet won a Stanley Cup, the next highest being No. 38-ranked Marcel Dionne.
Stanley Cup champion  —  2001.
In 2017, he was named one of the 100 Greatest NHL Players.

Career statistics

Regular season and playoffs

International

See also
 List of NHL statistical leaders
 Notable families in the NHL
 List of NHL players with 1,000 assists
 List of NHL players with 1,000 games played

References

External links
 
 
 
 

1960 births
Boston Bruins captains
Boston Bruins draft picks
Boston Bruins players
Calder Trophy winners
Canadian ice hockey defencemen
Canadian people of French descent
Colorado Avalanche players
French Quebecers
Hockey Hall of Fame inductees
Ice hockey people from Montreal
Ice hockey players at the 1998 Winter Olympics
James Norris Memorial Trophy winners
King Clancy Memorial Trophy winners
Lester Patrick Trophy recipients
Living people
National Hockey League All-Stars
National Hockey League first-round draft picks
National Hockey League players with retired numbers
Olympic ice hockey players of Canada
People from Saint-Laurent, Quebec
Sorel Éperviers players
Stanley Cup champions
Trois-Rivières Draveurs players
Verdun Éperviers players